Monymusk is a planned village in the Marr area of Aberdeenshire, Scotland.

History
Malcolm Canmore first established a Celtic foundation on the site in 1078. The Culdees of Munimusc are recorded as inhabiting the site in 1170. Monymusk Priory, an Augustinian priory, was built by Gilchrist, Earl of Mar, around 1200. The estate passed from the Forbes family to the Grant family in 1712, and Sir Archibald Grant established a planned village for estate workers. Monymusk Parish Church today occupies the location.

The village was largely rebuilt again in 1840.

In modern times, Monymusk serves as a site for fishing on the nearby River Don.

The village was served by Monymusk railway station on the Alford Valley Railway from 1859 to 1950. The station was sited approximately half a mile south of the village.

People
The eminent geologist and palaeontologist Dame Maria Matilda Ogilvie Gordon was born in the village in 1864.  The painters Archibald and Alexander Robertson were also natives of the village. Child actor and historian Jon Whiteley was born here in 1945.

Legacy
A 1776 strathspey was named after the estate, and a 1786 contra dance was named after the strathspey. The dance is still widely danced today.

Gallery

See also
 House of Monymusk
 Monymusk Reliquary

References

External links

 Monymusk community website
 Monymusk Hall

Planned developments
Villages in Aberdeenshire
1170 establishments in Scotland
World War II prisoner of war camps in Scotland